DWCT may refer to:

 DWCT-FM, the former callsign of DWJM (88.3 MHz) in Metro Manila.
 DWCT-AM, a radio station (1557 kHz) in Legazpi.
 Holy Name University, a Catholic university, high school and elementary school located in Tagbilaran, Bohol, Philippines; initialism from former name Divine Word College of Tagbilaran